The Snake River is a  tributary of the Portage River (Keweenaw Waterway) on the Upper Peninsula of Michigan in the United States. Via the Portage River, its water flows to Lake Superior.

See also
List of rivers of Michigan

References

Michigan  Streamflow Data from the USGS

Rivers of Michigan
Rivers of Houghton County, Michigan
Tributaries of Lake Superior